The Mitsubishi Vulcan engine, identified by the code 2G2, is an iron-block twin cylinder engine with three main bearings, built by Mitsubishi Motors for kei car class vehicles from September 1972. It was an overhead camshaft design, and superseded the older two-stroke 2G1 series. The 2G2 was in turn replaced by the Multi-valve 3G8 three-cylinder series.

2G21

Specifications

"MCA" stood for "Mitsubishi Clean Air", reflecting Japan's new air quality laws. The MCA-II was cleaner yet, and with balance shafts it also offered a much smoother run, at the loss of a few horsepower. The Sports engine did not meet the stricter emissions laws, which led to the demise of the Skipper.

Applications
10.1972-04.1976 Mitsubishi Minica F4
10.1972-12.1974 Mitsubishi Minica Skipper IV

2G22

Specifications

This engine met the enlarged kei-jidosha regulations which took effect at the end of 1975. It was called the Vulcan S in period advertising and went on sale in mid-April 1976; it was the first of the new, enlarged class of kei cars to hit the market. It had been thought that the rules would only allow for 500 cc, so a number of manufacturers had to quickly develop 550 cc models. The 2G22 was only built for ten months.

Applications
1976.04-1977.06 Mitsubishi Minica 5
1976.04-1977.03 Mitsubishi Minica 5 Van
1976.04-1977.03 Mitsubishi Minicab 5 (truck)

2G23
The G23B engines also featured the MCA-JET improved emissions system with a catalytic converter and three valves per cylinder. For the last two years (until summer of 1989), production was only for the Mazda Porter.

Specifications

Applications
1977-1979 Mitsubishi Minicab Wide 55 (LO13)
1979-1987 Mitsubishi Minicab (truck)
03.1977-09.1981 Minica 55 Van
06.1977-02.1984 Mitsubishi Minica Ami 55/Ami L/Econo
02.1984-01.1987 Mitsubishi Minica/Econo 5th generation
1977-1981 Mitsubishi L100
1977-83 Mazda New Porter Cab (2G23)
1983-07.1989 Mazda Porter Cab (G23B)

2G24

Specifications

Produced 8.82-12.83

Applications
11.1981–1983 Mitsubishi Minicab 700 (truck)
1985-1990s Liuzhou Wuling LZ110

2G25

Specifications

Produced 1.84-11.88

Applications
 1984 Mitsubishi Towny (Minica) (Taiwan)
 1984 Mitsubishi Minicab 800 (truck)

See also
List of Mitsubishi engines

References

 360cc: Nippon 軽自動車 Memorial 1950-1975. Tokyo: Yaesu Publishing, 2007. 
 Car Graphic: Car Archives Vol. 5, '70s Japanese Cars. Nigensha, 2007. 
 Car Graphic: Car Archives Vol. 11, '80s Japanese Cars. Nigensha, 2007. 
 Kazuo Ozeki, Memories of Japanese K-cars: 1951 ~ 1975. Miki Press, 2007. 

Vulcan
Straight-twin engines
Gasoline engines by model